Microsoft Combat Flight Simulator: WWII Europe Series is the first version of all three combat flight simulation games from Microsoft. It was released on 28 October 1998 and it is set in the European Theatre of World War II. This game spawned two sequels: Combat Flight Simulator 2 in 2000 and Combat Flight Simulator 3: Battle for Europe in 2002.

Gameplay
Combat Flight Simulator features 6 modes, Free Flight, Quick Combat, Single Missions, Campaigns, Multiplayer, and Training Missions.
Free Flight allows players to fly around the entirety of Europe. Quick Combat puts the player into the air against waves of AI opponents. Single Missions are missions where you have to take-off to complete tasks, before landing. Campaigns are more elaborate mission sequences. Multiplayer was a mode that allowed you to fly online with other players, fly in formations, and engage in dog-fights. Training Missions are missions that teach you dogfighting techniques and the basics of flight. 

(Note that this description do not apply to the new MSFS 2020 where dog fighting is not possible nor any weapon utilisation even if warbirds and fighter jets are available)

Reception

Sales
Combat Flight Simulator was a commercial success. It was the United States' 19th-best-selling computer game during the first half of 1999, and totaled 260,708 sales and $10.8 million revenues in the country by that October. The game's defeat of its direct competitor, Jane's WWII Fighters, contributed to the end of Electronic Arts' Jane's Combat Simulations brand.

Global sales surpassed 450,000 copies by June 2000.

Critical reviews

Combat Flight Simulator was a finalist for Computer Gaming Worlds 1998 "Best Simulation" award, which ultimately went to European Air War.

See also 
European Air War
Jane's WWII Fighters

References

External links
Official website via Internet Archive
Microsoft Combat Flight Simulator at MobyGames

1998 video games
Microsoft games
Microsoft franchises
Video games developed in the United States
Video games set in Europe
World War II flight simulation video games
Windows games
Windows-only games